An Aasen Bomb (Italian: Granata con manico e paracadute tipo Aasen A2) was an early World War I bomb fashioned from a hand grenade with a handle and parachute.

History

Creation 
The Aasen bomb was developed originally in Denmark by Nils Waltersen Aasen, who it was named after, by his Det Aasenske Granatkompani. He was a Norwegian arms inventor who developed a wide range of early prototypes which would later lead to the modern hand grenade for the military use.

Users 
Italy would adopt the bombs in 1912 to assist with the Italian invasion of Libya. They were also adopted for a short period at the onset of World War I by Germany and France.

Other countries and leaders would also become interested in the weapon, with Russia ordering one million grenades and the Pope buying two thousand.

Design 
The bomb was made of an 80mm x 105mm piece of iron based sheet metal forming the head with a 330mm wooden handle. The bomb itself weighed 3 kg.

It could be used as a torpedo, land mine, or aerial bomb based on the type of detonator installed. Italy would famously use them in early aerial bombardments; dropping them on the intended target from Italian military aircraft. The aerial bombs would make use of a highly sensitive contact exploder to minimize misfire potential.

To ensure that it did not bury itself in the ground before exploding, the bomb would also release a small parachute. The parachute was also designed to neutralize issues with horizontal velocity. As the bomb fell an internal arming mechanism would either rotate around a threaded end of the handle, arming it as it fell, or burn a length of wool that acted as a safety mechanism.

References

Aerial bombs of Italy
World War I weapons of Italy
Norwegian inventions